Dimitrios Lappas (also spelled Demetris, born 18 December 1972) is a Cypriot windsurfer. He competed at the 1996 Summer Olympics and the 2000 Summer Olympics.

References

External links
 
 

1972 births
Living people
Cypriot male sailors (sport)
Cypriot windsurfers
Olympic sailors of Cyprus
Sailors at the 1996 Summer Olympics – Mistral One Design
Sailors at the 2000 Summer Olympics – Mistral One Design
Place of birth missing (living people)